Mexico has been participating  at the Deaflympics since making its debut way back in 1965. Mexico won its first Deaflympic medal in the 2001 Summer Deaflympics for Athletics. In the 2017 Summer Deaflympics, Mexico won its first ever gold medal in Deaflympics history for Judo.

Mexico yet to make its debut in the Winter Deaflympics.

Summer Deaflympics

Medals by Summer Sport

See also 
 Mexico at the Olympics
 Mexico at the Paralympics

References